Wolbachia is a genus of intracellular bacteria that infects mainly arthropod species, including a high proportion of insects, and also some nematodes. It is one of the most common parasitic microbes, and is possibly the most common reproductive parasite in the biosphere. Its interactions with its hosts are often complex, and in some cases have evolved to be mutualistic rather than parasitic. Some host species cannot reproduce, or even survive, without Wolbachia colonisation. One study concluded that more than 16% of neotropical insect species carry bacteria of this genus, and as many as 25 to 70% of all insect species are estimated to be potential hosts.

History
The genus was first identified in 1924 by Marshall Hertig and Simeon Burt Wolbach in the common house mosquito. They described it as "a somewhat pleomorphic, rodlike, Gram-negative, intracellular organism [that] apparently infects only the ovaries and testes". Hertig formally described the species in 1936, and proposed both the generic and specific names: Wolbachia pipientis. Research on Wolbachia intensified after 1971, when Janice Yen and A. Ralph Barr of UCLA discovered that Culex mosquito eggs were killed by a cytoplasmic incompatibility when the sperm of Wolbachia-infected males fertilized infection-free eggs. The genus Wolbachia is of considerable interest today due to its ubiquitous distribution, its many different evolutionary interactions, and its potential use as a biocontrol agent.

Phylogenetic studies have shown that Wolbachia persica (now Francisella persica) was closely related to species in the genus Francisella and that Wolbachia melophagi (now Bartonella melophagi) was closely related to species in the genus Bartonella, leading to a transfer of these species to these respective genera. Furthermore, unlike true Wolbachia, which needs a host cell to multiply, F. persica and B. melophagi can be cultured on agar plates.

Method of sexual differentiation in hosts
These bacteria can infect many different types of organs, but are most notable for the infections of the testes and ovaries of their hosts. Wolbachia species are ubiquitous in mature eggs, but not mature sperm. Only infected females, therefore, pass the infection on to their offspring. Wolbachia bacteria maximize their spread by significantly altering the reproductive capabilities of their hosts, with four different phenotypes:

 Male killing occurs when infected males die during larval development, which increases the rate of born, infected females.
 Feminization results in infected males that develop as females or infertile pseudofemales. This is especially prevalent in Lepidoptera species such as the adzuki bean borer (Ostrinia scapulalis).
 Parthenogenesis is reproduction of infected females without males. Some scientists have suggested that parthenogenesis may always be attributable to the effects of Wolbachia. Though this is not the case for the marbled crayfish. An example of parthenogenesis induced by presence of Wolbachia are some species within the Trichogramma parasitoid wasp genus, which have evolved to procreate without males due to the presence of Wolbachia. Males are rare in this genus of wasp, possibly because many have been killed by that same strain of Wolbachia.
 Cytoplasmic incompatibility is the inability of Wolbachia-infected males to successfully reproduce with uninfected females or females infected with another Wolbachia strain. This reduces the reproductive success of those uninfected females and therefore promotes the infecting strain. In the cytoplasmic incompatibility mechanism, Wolbachia interferes with the parental chromosomes during the first mitotic divisions to the extent that they can no longer divide in synchrony.

Effects of sexual differentiation in hosts 
Several host species, such as those within the genus Trichogramma, are so dependent on sexual differentiation of Wolbachia that they are unable to reproduce effectively without the bacteria in their bodies, and some might even be unable to survive uninfected.

One study on infected woodlice showed the broods of infected organisms had a higher proportion of females than their uninfected counterparts.

Wolbachia, especially Wolbachia-caused cytoplasmic incompatibility, may be important in promoting speciation. Wolbachia strains that distort the sex ratio may alter their host's pattern of sexual selection in nature, and also engender strong selection to prevent their action, leading to some of the fastest examples of natural selection in natural populations.

The male killing and feminization effects of Wolbachia infections can also lead to speciation in their hosts. For example, populations of the pill woodlouse, Armadillidium vulgare which are exposed to the feminizing effects of Wolbachia, have been known to lose their female-determining chromosome. In these cases, only the presence of Wolbachia can cause an individual to develop into a female. Cryptic species of ground wētā (Hemiandrus maculifrons complex) are host to different lineages of Wolbachia which might explain their speciation without ecological or geographical separation.

Fitness advantages by Wolbachia infections 
Wolbachia infection has been linked to viral resistance in Drosophila melanogaster, Drosophila simulans, and mosquito species. Flies, including mosquitoes, infected with the bacteria are more resistant to RNA viruses such as Drosophila C virus, norovirus, flock house virus, cricket paralysis virus, chikungunya virus, and West Nile virus.

In the common house mosquito, higher levels of Wolbachia were correlated with more insecticide resistance.

In leafminers of the species Phyllonorycter blancardella, Wolbachia bacteria help their hosts produce green islands on yellowing tree leaves, that is, small areas of leaf remaining fresh, allowing the hosts to continue feeding while growing to their adult forms. Larvae treated with tetracycline, which kills Wolbachia, lose this ability and subsequently only 13% emerge successfully as adult moths.

Muscidifurax uniraptor, a parasitoid wasp, also benefits from hosting Wolbachia bacteria.

In the parasitic filarial nematode species responsible for elephantiasis, such as Brugia malayi and Wuchereria bancrofti, Wolbachia has become an obligate endosymbiont and provides the host with chemicals necessary for its reproduction and survival. Elimination of the Wolbachia symbionts through antibiotic treatment therefore prevents reproduction of the nematode, and eventually results in its premature death.

Some Wolbachia species that infect arthropods also provide some metabolic provisioning to their hosts. In Drosophila melanogaster, Wolbachia is found to mediate iron metabolism under nutritional stress and in Cimex lectularius, the Wolbachia strain cCle helps the host to synthesize B vitamins.

Some Wolbachia strains have increased their prevalence by increasing their hosts' fecundity. Wolbachia strains captured from 1988 in southern California still induce a fecundity deficit, but nowadays the fecundity deficit is replaced with a fecundity advantage such that infected Drosophila simulans produces more offspring than the uninfected ones.

Life-history consequences of Wolbachia infection 
Wolbachia often manipulates host reproduction and life-history in a way that favours its own propagation. In the Pharaoh ant, Wolbachia infection correlates with increased colony-level production of reproductives (i.e., greater reproductive investment), and earlier onset of reproductive production (i.e., shorter life-cycle). Infected colonies also seem to grow more rapidly. There is substantial evidence that the presence of Wolbachia that induce parthenogenesis have put pressure on species to reproduce primarily or entirely this way.

Additionally, Wolbachia has been seen to decrease the lifespan of Aedes aegypti, carriers of mosquito-borne diseases, and it decreases their efficacy of pathogen transmission because older mosquitoes are more likely to have become carriers of one of those diseases. This has been exploited as a method for pest control.

Genomics
The first Wolbachia genome to be determined was that of one that infects D. melanogaster fruit flies. This genome was sequenced at The Institute for Genomic Research in a collaboration between Jonathan Eisen and Scott O'Neill. The second Wolbachia genome to be determined was one that infects Brugia malayi nematodes. Genome sequencing projects for several other Wolbachia strains are in progress. A nearly complete copy of the Wolbachia genome sequence was found within the genome sequence of the fruit fly Drosophila ananassae and large segments were found in seven other Drosophila species.

In an application of DNA barcoding to the identification of species of Protocalliphora flies, several distinct morphospecies had identical cytochrome c oxidase I gene sequences, most likely through horizontal gene transfer (HGT) by Wolbachia species as they jump across host species. As a result, Wolbachia can cause misleading results in molecular cladistical analyses. It is estimated that between 20 and 50 percent of insect species have evidence of HGT from Wolbachia—passing from microbes to animal (i.e. insects).

Horizontal gene transfer 
Wolbachia species also harbor a bacteriophage called bacteriophage WO or phage WO. Comparative sequence analyses of bacteriophage WO offer some of the most compelling examples of large-scale horizontal gene transfer between Wolbachia coinfections in the same host. It is the first bacteriophage implicated in frequent lateral transfer between the genomes of bacterial endosymbionts. Gene transfer by bacteriophages could drive significant evolutionary change in the genomes of intracellular bacteria that were previously considered highly stable or prone to loss of genes over time.

Small RNA 
The small non-coding RNAs WsnRNA-46 and WsnRNA-59 in Wolbachia were detected in Aedes aegypti mosquitoes and Drosophila melanogaster. The small RNAs (sRNAs) may regulate bacterial and host genes. Highly conserved intragenic region sRNA called ncrwmel02 was also identified in Wolbachia pipientis. It is expressed in four different strains in a regulated pattern that differs according to the sex of the host and the tissue localisation. This suggested that the sRNA may play important roles in the biology of Wolbachia.

Relation to human-related infections

Disease vector
Outside of insects, Wolbachia infects a variety of isopod species, spiders, mites, and many species of filarial nematodes (a type of parasitic worm), including those causing onchocerciasis (river blindness) and elephantiasis in humans, as well as heartworms in dogs. Not only are these disease-causing filarial worms infected with Wolbachia, but Wolbachia also seems to play an inordinate role in these diseases.

A large part of the pathogenicity of filarial nematodes is due to host immune response toward their Wolbachia. Elimination of Wolbachia from filarial nematodes generally results in either death or sterility of the nematode. Consequently, current strategies for control of filarial nematode diseases include elimination of their symbiotic Wolbachia via the simple doxycycline antibiotic, rather than directly killing the nematode with often more toxic antinematode medications.

Disease prevention 

Naturally existing strains of Wolbachia have been shown to be a route for vector control strategies because of their presence in arthropod populations, such as mosquitoes. Due to the unique traits of Wolbachia that cause cytoplasmic incompatibility, some strains are useful to humans as a promoter of genetic drive within an insect population. Wolbachia-infected females are able to produce offspring with uninfected and infected males; however, uninfected females are only able to produce viable offspring with uninfected males. This gives infected females a reproductive advantage that is greater the higher the frequency of Wolbachia in the population. Computational models predict that introducing Wolbachia strains into natural populations will reduce pathogen transmission and reduce overall disease burden. An example includes a life-shortening Wolbachia that can be used to control dengue virus and malaria by eliminating the older insects that contain more parasites. Promoting the survival and reproduction of younger insects lessens selection pressure for evolution of resistance.

In addition, some Wolbachia strains are able to directly reduce viral replication inside the insect. For dengue they include wAllbB and wMelPop with Aedes aegypti, wMel with Aedes albopictus. and Aedes aegypti. A trial in an Australian city with 187,000 inhabitants plagued by dengue had no cases in four years, following introduction of mosquitoes infected with Wolbachia. Earlier trials in much smaller areas had been carried out, but the effect in a larger area had not been tested. There did not appear to be any environmental ill-effects. The cost was A$15 per inhabitant, but it was hoped that it could be reduced to US$1 in poorer countries with lower labor costs. The "strongest evidence yet" to support the Wolbachia technique was found in its first randomized controlled trial, conducted between 2016 and 2020 in Yogyakarta, an Indonesian city of about 400,000 inhabitants. In August 2020, the trial's Indonesian lead scientist Adi Utarini announced that the trial showed a 77% reduction in dengue cases compared to the control areas.
 
Wolbachia has also been identified to inhibit replication of chikungunya virus (CHIKV) in A. aegypti. The wMel strain of Wolbachia pipientis significantly reduced infection and dissemination rates of CHIKV in mosquitoes, compared to Wolbachia uninfected controls and the same phenomenon was observed in yellow fever virus infection converting this bacterium in an excellent promise for YFV and CHIKV suppression.

Wolbachia also inhibits the secretion of West Nile virus (WNV) in cell line Aag2 derived from A. aegypti cells. The mechanism is somewhat novel, as the bacteria actually enhances the production of viral genomic RNA in the cell line Wolbachia. Also, the antiviral effect in intrathoracically infected mosquitoes depends on the strain of Wolbachia, and the replication of the virus in orally fed mosquitoes was completely inhibited in wMelPop strain of Wolbachia.

The effect of Wolbachia infection on virus replication in insect hosts is complex and depends on the Wolbachia strain and virus species. While several studies have indicated consistent refractory phenotypes of Wolbachia infection on positive-sense RNA viruses in Drosophila melanogaster, the yellow fever mosquito Aedes aegypti and the Asian tiger mosquito Aedes albopictus. This effect is not seen in DNA virus infection and in some cases Wolbachia infection has been associated or shown to increase single stranded DNA and double-stranded DNA virus infection. There is also currently no evidence that Wolbachia infection restricts any tested negative-sense RNA viruses indicating Wolbachia would be unsuitable for restriction of negative-sense RNA arthropod borne viruses.

Wolbachia infection can also increase mosquito resistance to malaria, as shown in Anopheles stephensi where the wAlbB strain of Wolbachia hindered the lifecycle of Plasmodium falciparum.

However, Wolbachia infections can enhance pathogen transmission. Wolbachia has enhanced multiple arboviruses in Culex tarsalis mosquitoes. In another study, West Nile Virus (WNV) infection rate was significantly higher in Wolbachia-infected mosquitoes compared to controls.
 

Wolbachia may induce reactive oxygen species–dependent activation of the Toll (gene family) pathway, which is essential for activation of antimicrobial peptides, defensins, and cecropins that help to inhibit virus proliferation. Conversely, certain strains actually dampen the pathway, leading to higher replication of viruses. One example is with strain wAlbB in Culex tarsalis, where infected mosquitoes actually carried the west nile virus (WNV) more frequently. This is because wAlbB inhibits REL1, an activator of the antiviral Toll immune pathway. As a result, careful studies of the Wolbachia strain and ecological consequences must be done before releasing artificially-infected mosquitoes in the environment.

Deployments 

In 2016 it was proposed to combat the spread of the Zika virus by breeding and releasing mosquitoes that have intentionally been infected with an appropriate strain of Wolbachia. A contemporary study has shown that Wolbachia has the ability to block the spread of Zika virus in mosquitoes in Brazil.

In October 2016, it was announced that US$18 million in funding was being allocated for the use of Wolbachia-infected mosquitoes to fight Zika and dengue viruses. Deployment is slated for early 2017 in Colombia and Brazil.

In July 2017, Verily, the life sciences arm of Google's parent company Alphabet Inc., announced a plan to release about 20 million Wolbachia-infected Aedes aegypti mosquitoes in Fresno, California, in an attempt to combat the Zika virus. Singapore's National Environment Agency has teamed up with Verily to come up with an advanced, more efficient way to release male Wolbachia mosquitoes for Phase 2 of its study to suppress the urban Aedes aegypti mosquito population and fight dengue.

On November 3, 2017, the US Environmental Protection Agency (EPA) registered Mosquito Mate, Inc. to release Wolbachia-infected mosquitoes in 20 US states and the District of Columbia.

Effect on the sex-differentiation enzyme aromatase

The enzyme aromatase is found to mediate sex-change in many species of fish. Wolbachia can affect the activity of aromatase in developing fish embryos.

See also 
 Intragenomic conflict
 Quorum sensing

References

Further reading

External links 
 Virtual Museum of Bacteria
 Wolbachia research portal at the National Science Foundation
 
 
 The Wolbachia Project at Vanderbilt University
 Images of Wolbachia

Bacteria genera
Endosymbiotic events
Gram-negative bacteria
Rickettsiales